Robert M. "Bobby" Chesney is an American lawyer and the Dean of the University of Texas School of Law. He is the Charles I. Francis Professor in Law and was the associate dean for academic affairs before becoming the dean. Chesney teaches courses relating to U.S. national security and constitutional law. He is also the director of the Strauss Center for International Security and Law. Chesney addresses issues involving national security and law, including matters relating to military detention, the use of force, terrorism-related prosecutions, the role of the courts in national security affairs and the relationship between military and intelligence community activities. He is a co-founder and contributor along with Benjamin Wittes and Jack Goldsmith to the Lawfare Blog. He also co-hosts The National Security Law Podcast with fellow Texas law professor Stephen Vladeck.

Career
In addition to his post at the University of Texas School of Law, Chesney is also a non-resident senior fellow at the Brookings Institution, a senior editor for the Journal of National Security Law & Policy and director of the Robert S. Strauss Center for International Security and Law. He also holds a courtesy appointment at the LBJ School of Public Policy. In 2009, he served on the Detention Policy Task Force created by President Barack Obama, which was tasked with developing long-term policy in relation to the capture, detention, trial or other disposition of persons in the context of combat and counterterrorism operations.
Previously, he was a law professor at Wake Forest University School of Law. Before that he practiced law with Davis Polk & Wardwell in New York. He clerked on both the United States District Court for the Southern District of New York and the United States Court of Appeals for the Second Circuit. Chesney is a magna cum laude graduate of both Harvard Law School and Texas Christian University. 

In May 2022, it was announced that Chesney had been selected to be the next dean of the University of Texas School of Law, succeeding Ward Farnsworth, who had held the position since 2012.

Teaching
Chesney has taught a range of subjects, including constitutional law, national security law, evidence, the role of the judiciary in national security affairs, civil procedure, and U.S. counterterrorism policy in legal and historical perspective. He was named Wake Forest University School of Law's Teacher of the Year for 2004 and 2007.

Publications

Chesney has written or co-authored many articles relating to the legal aspects of U.S. national security policies and practices:

Podcast
Chesney co-hosts the National Security Law Podcast with fellow University of Texas law professor Stephen Vladeck.

References

External links
 Lawfare Blog
National Security Law Podcast

Living people
American lawyers
Wake Forest University faculty
Harvard Law School alumni
Texas Christian University alumni
University of Texas School of Law alumni
1971 births